The enzyme phosphogluconate dehydratase catalyzes the chemical reaction

6-phospho-D-gluconate  2-dehydro-3-deoxy-6-phospho-D-gluconate + H2O

This enzyme belongs to the family of lyases, specifically the hydro-lyases, which cleave carbon-oxygen bonds.  The systematic name of this enzyme class is 6-phospho-D-gluconate hydro-lyase (2-dehydro-3-deoxy-6-phospho-D-gluconate-forming). Other names in common use include 6-phosphogluconate dehydratase, 6-phosphogluconic dehydrase, gluconate-6-phosphate dehydratase, gluconate 6-phosphate dehydratase, 6-phosphogluconate dehydrase, and 6-phospho-Dgluconate hydro-lyase.  This enzyme participates in the Entner–Doudoroff pathway.

Structural studies

As of late 2007, only one structure has been solved for this class of enzymes, with the PDB accession code .

References

 

EC 4.2.1
Enzymes of known structure